The Man by the Shore is a 1993 Haitian-French drama film directed by Raoul Peck. It was entered into the 1993 Cannes Film Festival. It was financed by Canada and France. It was released by KJM3 Entertainment Group, an independent film distribution company that also distributed with Kino International, Daughters of the Dust by Julie Dash.

The film tells the traumatizing story of Sarah (Jennifer Zubar) and her family during the  tyrannical regime of François Duvalier (Papa doc).

Cast
 Jennifer Zubar as Sarah
 Toto Bissainthe as Camille Desrouillere
 Patrick Rameau as Gracieux Sorel
 Jean-Michel Martial as Janvier
 Mireille Metellus as Aunt Elide
 Magaly Berdy as Mirabelle
 Johanne Degand as Jeanne
 Douveline Saint-Louis as Sabine
 François Latour as François Jansson
 Aïlo Auguste-Judith as Gisèle Jeansson
 Albert Delpy as Assad
 Michèle Marcelin as Madame Janvier
 Norah Moriceau as Annie Sarah
 Fritzner Cedon as Nazaire
 Michèle Léger as Mère Suzanne
 Anne Mejia as Mère Séverine

References

External links

1993 films
1993 drama films
Haitian Creole-language films
Haitian drama films
French drama films
1990s French-language films
Films directed by Raoul Peck
Films shot in the Dominican Republic
1993 multilingual films
French multilingual films
1990s French films